An election to Cavan County Council took place on 5 June 2004 as part of that year's Irish local elections. 25 councillors were elected from six electoral divisions by PR-STV voting for a five-year term of office.

Results by party

Results by Electoral Area

Bailieborough

Ballyjamesduff

Belturbet

Cavan

External links
 Official website

2004 Irish local elections
2004